Sagonne is a commune in the Cher department in the Centre-Val de Loire region of France.

Geography
Sagonne is farming village situated by the banks of the small river Sagonin, some 37 km southeast of Bourges, at the junction of the D76 with the D109 and D2076 roads.

Population

Sights
 The Romanesque church of St. Laurent, dating from the twelfth century.
 Château de Sagonne, a 12th to 17th century castle, in the heart of the village.
 Some fifteenth-century houses.
 A museum at the castle, housing a 14th-century collection of weapons, paintings and tapestry.

Personalities
Charles II d'Amboise de Chaumont : Grand Admiral and Marshal of France.
Gabrielle d'Estrée : mistress of Henry IV.
Jules Hardouin-Mansart : architect to Louis XIV.

See also
Communes of the Cher department

References

External links

Official website 

Communes of Cher (department)